Anne Poulet (born March 20, 1942) is a retired American art historian. Poulet is an expert in the area of French art, particularly sculpture. In her career, she organized two major monographic exhibitions on the French sculptors Clodion and Jean-Antoine Houdon, respectively.

Early life 
On March 20, 1942 Poulet was born in Washington, DC, U.S.

Education 
In 1964, Poulet earned a B.A. degree from Sweet Briar College, a private all women's college in Sweet Briar, Virginia. 
Poulet graduated cum laude. In 1970, Poulet completed her graduate studies at the New York University Institute of Fine Arts. In 1993, Poulet earned a certificate of graduation from Museum Management Institute in Berkeley, California.

Career 
Poulet served for twenty years as a Curator Emerita in the department of decorative arts and sculpture at the Museum of Fine Arts, Boston in Boston, Massachusetts. While Poulet was the curator, she was responsible for adding many acquisitions to the museum, including the Firestone Collection of French silver, Frits and Rita Markus Collection of ceramics and enamel, William A. Coolidge Collection of painting, sculpture and decorative arts and Edward Pflueger Collection of ceramics.

In October 2003, Poulet was appointed as the director of The Frick Collection, a museum in New York City, New York. Poulet became the first female director in the museum's history. In 2011, Poulet created and published The Frick Collection, a general guide to the museum's collection. In 2011, Poulet retired as the museum director. Poulet was succeeded by Ian Wardropper.

In September 2011, Poulet joined the Institute of Fine Arts' Board of Trustees at NYU.

In 2019, Poulet was a judge in the French Heritage Society Book Award.

Lectures 
List of Poulet's art lectures.
 November 6, 2003 The First Statuary in the World: Jean-Antoine Houdon. The Getty Center.
 November 2011 A Gallery of Worthies: Thomas Jefferson and Jean Antoine Houdon. University of Georgia - Lamar Dodd School of Art.
 November 2012 On the Run: Clodion's Bacchanalian Figures. Dallas Museum of At.

Awards and recognitions 
 Ford Foundation grant in museum training.
 Kress Fellow.
 2000 Iris Foundation Award winner.
 2007 Chevalier dans l'Ordre des Arts et des Lettres, France.
 2008 Awards in Italian Culture 2008 - American Award.

Works
Corot to Braque: French Paintings from the Museum of Fine Arts, Boston, 1979,  
Clodion, 1738-1814, 1992,  
Jean-Antoine Houdon: Sculptor of the Enlightenment, 2003,

See also 
 List of female art museum directors

References

External links
 Anne L. Poulet at frick.org
 Anne L. Poulet Curatorial Fellowship
 Anne L. Poulet at artdaily.cc
 Anne Poulet 2012 lecture at dma.org
 Clodion at Columbia
 Anne Poulet of The Frick Collection at WSJ (subscription require)

1942 births
Living people
Sweet Briar College alumni
New York University Institute of Fine Arts alumni
Directors of museums in the United States
Women museum directors
Chevaliers of the Ordre des Arts et des Lettres
American art curators
American women curators
Museum of Fine Arts, Boston
Directors of the Frick Collection
21st-century American women